Michal Šlesingr  (born 3 February 1983) is a Czech former biathlete.

Biathlon results
All results are sourced from the International Biathlon Union.

Olympic Games

*The mixed relay was added as an event in 2014.

World Championships
3 medals (1 gold, 1 silver, 1 bronze)

*During Olympic seasons competitions are only held for those events not included in the Olympic program.
**The mixed relay was added as an event in 2005, with the single mixed relay being added in 2019.

Individual victories
1 victory (1 MS)

*Results are from UIPMB and IBU races which include the Biathlon World Cup, Biathlon World Championships and the Winter Olympic Games.

References

External links
 
 

1983 births
Living people
People from Ústí nad Orlicí
Czech male biathletes
Biathletes at the 2006 Winter Olympics
Biathletes at the 2010 Winter Olympics
Biathletes at the 2014 Winter Olympics
Biathletes at the 2018 Winter Olympics
Olympic biathletes of the Czech Republic
Biathlon World Championships medalists
Holmenkollen Ski Festival winners
Sportspeople from the Pardubice Region